STA or Sta may refer to:

Organizations
 Samoa Tourism Authority
 Science & Technology Australia, a peak body for scientists and technologists
 Scottish Tartans Authority
 Spokane Transit Authority, US
 State Transit Authority, New South Wales, Australia
 State Transport Authority (South Australia), a former government agency
 STA Travel, for young people
 Slovenska tiskovna agencija, Slovenian Press Agency
 Student Transportation of America

Schools
 Saint Thomas Academy, Minnesota, US
 St. Theresita's Academy, Silay City, Philippines
 Shanghai Theatre Academy, Shanghai, China
 St. Thomas Aquinas High School (Louisville), Ohio, US
 St. Thomas Aquinas Catholic Secondary School (London, Ontario), Canada
 St. Albans School (Washington, D.C.), US

Science and technology
 Science & Technology Australia, a peak body for scientists and technologists
 Spacetime algebra, in mathematical physics
 Spike-triggered average, a tool for characterizing the response properties of a neuron
 Special temporary authority, to operate a radio station in the US
 Static timing analysis, of a digital circuit
 Station (computer networking), in IEEE 802.11 (Wi-Fi) terminology
 Simultaneous thermal analysis, in thermal analysis
 Single-Threaded Apartment, in Component Object Model

Military and space
 Shuttle Training Aircraft, a NASA training vehicle
 Surveillance and Target Acquisition, a military role
 STA platoon, up to the first Gulf War
 STA sniper, after the first Gulf War

Other uses
 SCSI Trade Association, STA or SCSITA
 Stauning Vestjylland Airport (IATA code), Denmark
 Sustainable Transport Award, to a city

See also
 Structural Test Article, for example Space Shuttle Challenger STA-099
 STA-21 or Seaman to Admiral - 21, U.S. Navy commissioning program